The 1910 Minnesota House of Representatives election was held in the U.S. state of Minnesota on November 8, 1910, to elect members to the House of the 37th Minnesota Legislature.

The Minnesota Republican Party won a large majority of seats, followed by the Minnesota Democratic Party, the Prohibition Party, and the Public Ownership Party. The new Legislature convened on January 3, 1911.

In 1910, the Minnesota House of Representatives was elected in a mixture of single-member and multi-member districts with election being determined by plurality.

Results

See also 

 1910 Minnesota gubernatorial election
 1910 Minnesota Senate election

Notes

References 

1910 Minnesota elections
Minnesota
Minnesota House of Representatives elections